П. O. (or Pi O, born 1951) is a Greek-Australian, working class, anarchist poet.

Born in Katerini, Greece, П. O. came to Australia with his family around 1954. After time in  Bonegilla Migrant Reception and Training Centre, the family moved to the Melbourne suburb of Fitzroy.

П. O. was inspired to start writing poetry in 1973 when he heard Johnny Cash reciting (religious) poetry while tuning his guitar. П. O. thought he could do as well or better. His work ranges from standup-type rants to 'conceptual' page poetry and concrete poetry, with a heavy emphasis on wordplay and capturing the vitality of everyday speech. Thematically, he commonly portrays the issues of non-Anglo-Celtic working class life.

His first published book, Fitzroy Brothel, was released in 1974. From 1978 to 1983, he was involved in producing the radical poetry magazine 925. After the publication of several more collections, his 740-page epic poem 24hrs was published in 1996 by Collective Effort Press.

He is a fixture of Melbourne's performance poetry scene and has edited an anthology of performance poetry (Off the Record) for Penguin. He has been editor of the literary journal Unusual Work.

П. O. won the 2020 Judith Wright Calanthe Prize for Poetry for Heide at the Queensland Premier's Literary Awards. He is a finalist for the 2021 Melbourne Prize for Literature.

Bibliography 
 Fitzroy brothel: Poems (1974)
 Emotions in concrete (1975)
 street singe (1976)
 л. 0. Revisited (Wild & Woolley, 1976) 
 Panash (Collective Effort, 1978)
 Missing Form: Concrete, visual and experimental poems (Collective Effort, 1981)
 The Fitzroy poems (Collective Effort, 1989)
 24 hrs: The day the language stood still (Collective Effort, 1996) 
 The Number Poems and Other Equations (Collective Effort, 2000)
 Big Numbers: New and Selected Poems (Collective Effort, 2008) 
 Fitzroy: The Biography (Collective Effort, 2015)
 Heide (Giramondo Publishing, 2019) 

Edited
 Missing Forms with Peter Murphy and Alex Selenitsch (Collective Effort, 1981)
 Off the Record (Penguin, 1985)

References

External links
 The Poetry of Π Ο
 Pi O - An appreciation by Billy Marshall Stoneking
 visual poetry
 Visual Poetry by PiO
 925 magazine
 Pi O Launches Oink, Oink, Oink by Eric Dando
  The rime of the anarchist wog 

1951 births
Australian anarchists
Greek emigrants to Australia
Living people
Poets from Melbourne
Spoken word poets
20th-century pseudonymous writers
21st-century pseudonymous writers
Visual poets